Bjørn Farmann ("Bjørn the Tradesman", also called Bjørn Haraldsson, Farmand and Kaupman, died between 930 and 934) was a king of Vestfold. Bjørn was one of the sons of King Harald Fairhair of Norway. In late tradition, Bjørn Farmann was made the great-grandfather of Olaf II of Norway, through a son Gudrød Bjørnsson.

Biography
Bjørn Farmann was one of the sons born of Harald Fairhair with Svanhild, daughter of Eystein Earl. When Harald Fairhair died, his kingdom was divided up between his sons. Bjørn Farmann became the king of Vestfold, the county west of the Oslofjord, and is considered as the founder of Tønsberg. Bjørn Farmann spent most of his time at the court at Sæheimr located near Sem, Norway. Erik Bloodaxe (Old Norse: Eiríkr blóðøx, Norwegian: Eirik Blodøks) was the eldest son of Harald Fairhair and became the second king of Norway (930–934). Once the power was in his hands, Erik Bloodaxe began to quarrel with his other brothers and had four of them killed, including Bjørn Farmann. Bjørn was killed by Eirik Bloodaxe in a feud around 930–934 AD at Sæheimr. Later in battle at Tønsberg, Erik Bloodaxe killed Olaf Haraldsson Geirstadalf, king of Vingulmark and later also of Vestfold together with Sigrød Haraldsson, king of Trondheim.

Farmannhaugen
Bjørn Farmann was reportedly killed by his brother King Eirik Bloodaxe at the Sæheimr estate. He is said to be buried in  Farmannshaugen  (from the Old Norse word haugr meaning burial mound), outside Tønsberg about 3 km east of the village of Sem, close to the manor of the Jarlsberg family. Farmannhaugen is visible from route 312. Farmannhaugen was archaeologically investigated during 1917.

Snorri Sturluson
Snorri Sturluson tells this of Bjørn, in an extract from Heimskringla, Harald Harfager's Saga:

References

External links
Bjørn Farmann monument
Farmannshaugen at Saeheim
Farmannshaugen - Royal viking mound in Tønsberg

Norwegian petty kings
People from Tønsberg
930s deaths
Year of birth unknown
Year of death uncertain